Paul Joseph Howard, nicknamed "Del", (May 20, 1884 – August 29, 1968) was an outfielder in Major League Baseball who played briefly for the Boston Red Sox during the 1909 season. He was born in Boston, Massachusetts.

Howard was a .200 hitter (3-for-15) with one double,  two runs and two RBI in six games. In six outfield appearances, he played at left field (4) and right (2), while posting a 1.000 fielding percentage in three chances.

Howard died in Miami, Florida at age 84, and is buried in Winthrop, Massachusetts

External links

Retrosheet
Baseball Almanac

1884 births
1968 deaths
Boston Red Sox players
Major League Baseball outfielders
Baseball players from Boston
Lowell Tigers players
Brockton Shoemakers players
St. Paul Saints (AA) players